This list includes commanders of the Turkish Air Force, who were, in their time of service, nominal heads of the Turkish Air Force.

The current Commander of the Turkish Air Force is General Hasan Küçükakyüz, since 22 August 2017.

See also 
 Chief of the Turkish General Staff
 List of commanders of the Turkish Land Forces
 List of commanders of the Turkish Naval Forces
 List of general commanders of the Turkish Gendarmerie
 List of commandants of the Turkish Coast Guard

References 

Air Force
Turkey